William Murdoch Morrison Whigham (9 October 1939 – 4 March 2021) was a Scottish footballer who played as a goalkeeper in the Scottish League for Albion Rovers (as a trialist), Falkirk and Dumbarton, and in the English Football League for Middlesbrough and Darlington.

References

1939 births
2021 deaths
Footballers from Airdrie, North Lanarkshire
Scottish footballers
Association football goalkeepers
Shotts Bon Accord F.C. players
Albion Rovers F.C. players
Falkirk F.C. players
Middlesbrough F.C. players
Dumbarton F.C. players
Darlington F.C. players
Scottish Football League players
English Football League players